Committee on Medium-term Path on Financial Inclusion is an experts committee formed by the Reserve Bank of India (RBI) on 15 July 2015 to create a five-year plan for financial inclusion in India. It is headed by Deepak Mohanty, executive director of RBI. It is expected to submit its report within four months.

Members
The committee was head by Deepak Mohanty. Other members of the committee were: 

 Ashok Gulati, Infosys Chair Professor for Agriculture, Indian Council for Research on International Economic Relations (ICRIER)
 Asli Demirgüç-Kunt, director of research, The World Bank
 A. P. Hota, MD & CEO, National Payments Corporation of India
 Paresh Sukthankar, deputy managing director, HDFC Bank 
 Kishor P. Kharat, executive director, Union Bank of India
 Subrata Gupta, chief general manager, National Bank for Agriculture and Rural Development
 Pawan Bakhshi, head – Financial Services for the poor programme in India, Bill and Melinda Gates Foundation
 Sudarshan Sen, principal chief general manager, Department of Banking Regulation, Reserve Bank of India
 Arun Pasricha, chief general manager, Consumer Education and Protection Department, Reserve Bank of India
 Nanda S. Dave, chief general manager, Department of Payment and Settlement Systems, Reserve Bank of India
 Y. K. Gupta, director, Department of Statistics and Information Management, Reserve Bank of India
 Saibal Ghosh, deputy adviser, research, Centre for Advanced Financial Research and Learning (CAFRAL)

Objective
The objective of the committee is to examine the existing policy regarding financial inclusion and the form a five-year  action plan. The plan will have several components with regard to payments, deposits, credit, social security transfers, pension and insurance. Each component will be made monitor-able with milestones to track the progress of the plan.

See also
 Raghuram Rajan Committee on Financial Sector Reforms
 Committee on Comprehensive Financial Services for Small Businesses and Low Income Households

References

Committees of the Reserve Bank of India
2015 establishments in India
Microfinance in India
2015 in Indian economy